Phalera grotei, or Grote's buff-tip, is a moth of the family Notodontidae. The species was first described by Frederic Moore in 1859. It is found in India, Sri Lanka, China, Thailand, Korea, Hong Kong, Vietnam, Indonesia to Sumatra and Borneo.

Gallery

References

Moths of Asia
Moths described in 1859
Notodontidae